Finbar Lynch (born 28 August 1959) is an Irish actor.

Early life
Lynch was born in Dublin and, at the age of 11, moved with his family to the village of Inverin, County Galway where his father ran a clothing factory under a scheme to encourage business investment in Gaeltacht areas. Lynch has 2 brothers.

Career
Back in Dublin at the age of 18, Lynch doorknocked local theatres seeking acting work but was turned down due to lack of experience. Working as a stagehand, he successfully auditioned for a minor role in the Tennessee Williams play A Streetcar Named Desire, which started off his acting career. In 1999, Lynch was nominated for the Tony Award for Best Featured Actor in a Play and Drama Desk Award for Outstanding Actor in a Play for his performance as Canary Jim in the Broadway run of the rediscovered Tennessee Williams play Not About Nightingales.

Lynch's television work includes recurring appearances in the soap opera Glenroe, Proof, Breathless and the miniseries Small World; as Doctor Martin Wells in the Bourne spin-off television series Treadstone, along with as minor appearances in Waking the Dead, Dalziel and Pascoe, Inspector George Gently, DCI Banks, Game of Thrones, Foyle's War, and The Mallorca Files.

Personal life
Lynch is married to actress Niamh Cusack and they have a son, Calam Lynch, who is also an actor.

References

External links

1959 births
Living people
Irish male stage actors
Irish male television actors
Irish male film actors
Male actors from County Galway
Male actors from Dublin (city)